Brother Love's Travelling Salvation Show is the fourth studio album by American singer-songwriter Neil Diamond, released in 1969. Four months after the title cut became a #22 hit, Diamond recorded and released a new single, "Sweet Caroline", which reached #4. Because of its popularity, this song was added to the end of later pressings of the album, which was also given a new sleeve with the album shown as Sweet Caroline/Brother Love's Travelling Salvation Show although the title was still written as Brother Love's Travelling Salvation Show on the label.

Track listing
All songs written by Neil Diamond.

Reception

In his Allmusic retrospective review music critic William Ruhlmann observes, "At times, the album betrayed the speed with which it had been put together, with songs like "Dig In" and "River Runs, New Grown Plums" coming off more as unfinished sketches than developed compositions... Diamond may have been aware that the material was mostly second-rate."

References

1969 albums
Neil Diamond albums
Uni Records albums
Albums produced by Tom Catalano
Albums produced by Chips Moman
Albums produced by Tommy Cogbill